Estelle Mærsk is a container ship owned and run by the Mærsk Line. She was, in 2009, the largest ever built by terms of gross tonnage. Estelle Mærsk has a capacity of 11,000 twenty-foot equivalent units (TEU), including around 1,000  reefer containers, though a maximum capacity of 13,500 TEU is claimed.

A coat of environmentally safe silicone paint is used on the hull below the waterline, reducing drag and thus increasing speed and saving up to 1,200 tons of fuel per year. Estelle Mærsk was built by Odense Steel Shipyard of Denmark in 2006. Mærsk claim that these technologies, and staying below  whenever possible, reduce emissions by around 25% compared to other ships.

An older ship of the same name was attacked with rocket propelled grenades by Iranians near Dubai in 1987, many years before the current Estelle was built.

References

Container ships
Merchant ships of Denmark
Ships of the Maersk Line
2006 ships
Ships built in Odense